The Albis is a chain of hills in the canton of Zurich, Switzerland.

Albis or Albiş may also refer to:

Albiș River, a river in Romania
Albis, the Latin name of the river Elbe
Albis (store), a Japanese supermarket company
Albis (ship, 1997), a passenger ship operating on Lake Zurich in Switzerland
Albiș, a village in Buduslău Commune, Bihor County, Romania
Albiș, a village in Cernat Commune, Covasna County, Romania

See also 
 Albi (disambiguation)